The 1973–74 DFB-Pokal was the 31st season of the annual German football cup competition. It began on 1 December 1973 and ended on 17 August 1974. 32 teams competed in the tournament of five rounds. In the final Eintracht Frankfurt defeated Hamburger SV 3–1 after extra time.

Mode
The tournament consisted of five single elimination rounds. In case a game ended with a draw 30 minutes of extra time were played. If the score was still level the game was replayed with 30 minutes of extra time in case of another draw. If still no winner could be determined, a penalty shootout decided which team advanced to the next round.

Matches

First round

Replays

Round of 16

Replays

Quarter-finals

Replay

Semi-finals

Final

References

External links
 Official site of the DFB 
 Kicker.de 
 1973–74 results at Fussballdaten.de 
 1973–74 results at Weltfussball.de 

1973-74
1973–74 in German football cups